Michael Kwaku Foli Folivi (born 25 February 1998) is an English professional footballer who plays as a forward for Chelmsford City.

Club career

Watford
Folivi signed his first professional contract with Watford in 2015 whilst still in the club's youth system and completed his scholarship in summer 2016. Having been part of the first team squad that travelled to Liverpool in the Premier League in November 2016, Folivi extended his contract until 2020. He made his professional debut on 3 January 2017, coming on as an 81st minute substitute for Sebastian Prodl in a 2–0 Premier League defeat away at Stoke City.

On 31 January 2017 Folivi joined League One side Coventry City on loan for the remainder of the season. Having been out injured with an ankle injury, Folivi made his only first team appearance coming on as a substitute for Marcus Tudgay in the final game of the season. He was an unused substitute as Coventry won the 2017 EFL Trophy Final at  Wembley Stadium.

On 11 January 2018 Folivi joined National League side Boreham Wood on loan for the remainder of the season. The club reached the play-offs, and Folivi scored what proved to be the decisive goal in their 3–2 win over Sutton United in the semi-finals. He started the final against Tranmere Rovers at Wembley Stadium but was taken off after 70 minutes, prior to Tranmere scoring the winner in a 2–1 victory.

On 31 January 2019, Folivi joined League One side AFC Wimbledon on loan for the rest of the season, playing 11 times as the club retained their status in the division. He rejoined Wimbledon on a season-long loan in July 2019, but the loan was cut short on 3 January. He was released by Watford in June 2020.

Colchester United
On 2 November 2020, Folivi signed a contract with League Two club Colchester United until the end of the 2020–21 season. He made his debut on 3 November as a substitute for Jevani Brown in Colchester's 3–1 home win against Stevenage. He scored his first goal for the club on 10 November in Colchester's 6–1 EFL Trophy win against Southend United.

With his contract with Colchester expiring in the summer, Folivi had been set to sign a new deal with the club. However, he sustained an Achilles tendon injury which resulted in him requiring surgery. As such, his new Colchester contract offer was put on hold.

Chelmsford City
On 20 February 2023, Folivi signed for Chelmsford City following his recovery from injury.

Personal life
Born in England, Folivi is of Ghanaian descent.

Career statistics

References

External links

1998 births
Living people
Footballers from Wembley
English footballers
English sportspeople of Ghanaian descent
Premier League players
English Football League players
Watford F.C. players
Coventry City F.C. players
Boreham Wood F.C. players
AFC Wimbledon players
Colchester United F.C. players
Chelmsford City F.C. players
Black British sportspeople
Association football forwards